Partial general elections were held in the southern part of the Faroe Islands on 2 February 1914. The Union Party remained the largest in the Løgting, with 12 of the 20 seats.

Results

References

Elections in the Faroe Islands
Faroe Islands
1914 in the Faroe Islands
February 1914 events
Election and referendum articles with incomplete results